Bhattiana is a tract of land lying in the Indian states of Haryana and Punjab between Hisar and the Garra. It was named Bhattiana because of being ruled by Bhatti.

Origin of name 
This geographical area derives its name from the clan of Bhattis, The Bhatti clan is found in the Punjab region. The Battiana territories, traditionally controlled by the Bhatis, covered a part of modern Haryana and Punjab, and extended up to Bikaner, Rajasthan.

History 
The region was devastated during the (late-14th century) invasion of the north-western parts of the Indian subcontinent by Timur. Thereafter, the regions fell under the control of the different rulers, including the Mughals, and with the weakening of the Mughals, became a part of the British Raj from mid-19th century. A district of Bhattiana was formed in 1837, but in 1858 it was transferred to the Punjab and absorbed into the Sirsa district, itself later divided up.

Current status 
Bhattiana no longer exists as an administrative unit and these regions are the parts of the Republic of India. Current day Sirsa was essentially Bhattiana but also included parts of current day Fatehabad district such as Ratia and Rania.

See also 
 Bhattu Kalan

References

Regions of Haryana
Regions of Punjab, India
Regions of Punjab, Pakistan